The 1916 United States presidential election in Vermont  took place on November 7, 1916, as part of the 1916 United States presidential election which was held throughout all contemporary 48 states. Voters chose four representatives, or electors to the Electoral College, who voted for president and vice president. 

Vermont was won by the Republican nominee, U.S. Supreme Court Justice Charles Evans Hughes of New York, and his running mate Senator Charles W. Fairbanks of Indiana. Hughes and Fairbanks defeated the Democratic nominees, incumbent Democratic President Woodrow Wilson and Vice President Thomas R. Marshall. 

Hughes won a decisive victory with 62.43% of the vote, to Wilson's 35.22%, a Republican victory margin of 27.21%.

Vermont historically was a bastion of liberal Northeastern Republicanism, and by 1916 the Green Mountain State had gone Republican in every presidential election since the founding of the Republican Party. From 1856 to 1912, Vermont had had the longest streak of voting Republican of any state, having never voted Democratic before, and this tradition continued in 1916. 

In 1912, Vermont had been one of only two states (along with Utah) to vote for incumbent Republican President William Howard Taft, who was pushed into third place nationally by the strong third party candidacy of Theodore Roosevelt, a former Republican president who had run in 1912 with his own Bull Moose Party. Taft and Roosevelt had split the Republican vote nationally in 1912, and in Vermont, Taft edged out Roosevelt 37–35, while Wilson had received only 24% of the vote. With the Republican base re-united behind Charles Evans Hughes in 1916, the GOP scored a landslide win in Vermont with over 62% of the vote, although Wilson also gained 11 points in support from his 1912 showing.  

Hughes carried thirteen of the state's fourteen counties, breaking 60% of the vote in 8 of them, and even breaking 70% in 2 counties. Wilson's only county victory came from sparsely populated Grand Isle County in the far northwest of the state, which had also been the only county in the state to give Wilson a plurality win in 1912. This was the first election since 1852 in which a Democratic candidate earned more than forty percent of the vote in any Vermont county.

As Wilson narrowly won re-election nationally, Vermont weighed in as over 30% more Republican than the national average in the 1916 election, making it the most Republican state in the union.

Results

Results by county

See also
 United States presidential elections in Vermont

References

Vermont
1916
1916 Vermont elections